The Pembina Region, also referred to as the Pembina District and Pembina Department, is the historic name of an unorganized territory of land that was ceded to the United States. The area included parts of what became North Dakota and a portion of central eastern to northeastern South Dakota. The eastern boundary was the Red River and included the Pembina River area. The region was formerly part of British Rupert's Land and the Red River Colony (controlled by the Hudson's Bay Company), that encompassed an area then known as the Assiniboia District, from 1763 to the signing of the Treaty of 1818. The treaty transferred the region that was south of the 49th parallel from the British to the United States.

The area was referred to as the Pembina Territory after the U.S. army explorer Stephen Harriman Long made surveys during the 1823 expedition to the Red River of the North and placed an International boundary marker north of Pembina clearly defining the border between the United States and British North America. From 1818 until 1823 Pembina was considered (by both countries) to be within the boundary of the United Kingdom. Territorial status as Pembina never reached fruition because of area political in-fighting.

Several attempts at formal recognition and naming failed to pass Congress. In 1849 Father Georges-Antoine Belcourt described the area, referred to as Pembina district or department, as a country about 400 miles from north to south and more than five hundred miles from east to west. The region was considered unorganized from 1818 until March 3, 1849, when the region was absorbed into the Territory of Minnesota. When Minnesota became a state on May 11, 1858, and the boundary was set at the Red River, the region became unorganized.

The remaining region that failed to make territory status was finally absorbed into the states of North and South Dakota.

History

Several events shaped the area of the Pembina Region within the United States. The Louisiana Purchase (1803) included almost all of current South Dakota, the southern half and some of the north-central part of Minnesota, that became the District of Louisiana. The area was populated mostly with Chippewa (Ojibwe), fur trappers, and Métis, that was a mixture of French and Indian.

After trying unsuccessfully to get a British land grant, because the land was under a monopoly of the Hudson's Bay Company (HBC), Thomas Douglas, 5th Earl of Selkirk acquired controlling interest in the HBC and received 116,000 square miles of land in the Selkirk Concession of 1811. The area of land within the grant became known as the Assiniboia Territory, and extended south to the watershed of the Red River near the 45th parallel north. The current community of Pembina was within the area.

Treaties

The Treaty of Paris (1783) did not clearly set northern United States/Canadian boundaries. According to the treaty the boundary line was to leave the Northwesternmost point of the Lake of the Woods (the current boundary) "on a due West Course to the river Mississippi" which is much farther south.

Jay Treaty (1796) boundaries issues were still unresolved in 1801. The Treaty of Ghent (1814-1815). The Rush–Bagot Treaty (April 16, 1818) was a treaty of disarmament and peaceful negotiations creating a demilitarized boundary. The following Treaty of Washington (1871) set up peaceful international arbitration. Indian treaties further open land to expansion and this was the beginning of the seeking of territorial status.

The Treaty of 1818 (October 20, 1818) was a land swap trading British land that extended south of the new 49th parallel boundary for US land that extended north of the border. This area was originally part of the Louisiana Purchase, and was renamed the Missouri Territory in 1812. The territorial government seat was in St. Louis. After a border survey in 1823, the Hudson's Bay Company could not continue to assume that Pembina stood on British soil and moved into southern Canada.

Territory of Minnesota

After 1849, the region of Pembina became part of the Territory of Minnesota. When Minnesota became a state in 1858 the area became unorganized again. A provisional government was set up that lobbied for territory status. The main reason to organize the area was to induce settlement with a more localized government. After the Dakota Territory was organized there was still a move for more local territorial control because of the distance to the territorial capital. Factions were attempting this in different areas of the territory. South Dakota introduced legislation, with the support of the Committee on Territories, for the creation of the West and East River Territories.

In 1868, after the discovery of gold in the Black Hills (1876), there was a proposal to separate the western half into the "Territory of Lincoln" and the eastern half as the Dakota Territory. In February 1872 the Senate Committee on Territories reviewed a bill to create the Pembina Territory with the capital at Bismarck, and Dakota (present-day South Dakota) with Yankton as the capital. A final solution was found on November 2, 1889, when both North and South Dakota became separate states.

Gallery

See also
 Treaty of Old Crossing
 Red River ox carts

References

Pre-statehood history of North Dakota
Pre-statehood history of Minnesota
Pre-statehood history of South Dakota
Rupert's Land